The Minjambuta were an Indigenous Australian tribe of northern Victoria.

Language
R. H. Mathews described their language as close to Dhudhuroa, indeed as a dialect of that tongue, but this conflicts with other reports.

Country
They extended southwards to the Dividing Range. These boundaries and their extension were established by Norman Tindale on the basis of inferences: he deduced their area by exclusion after the adjacent tribal areas were determined and the gap not covered was then assigned to the Minjambuta. The Dhudhuroa boundary lay to the northeast, the Jaitmathang to their east.

Social life
Very little is known of this tribe, and what little knowledge has been transmitted comes from the records preserved by the early ethnographer R. H. Mathews in 1904. The Minjambuta social organisation appears to share more similarities with those of the tribes to their south, and their Wonggoa initiation is thought to be alluded by Mathews when he included the following material without specifying the Minjambuta, but, contextually, according to Tindale, it would apply to them: 
"Of the Mitta Mitta and Ovens Rivers the following is a brief outline of the procedures as told to me by an old native: At the first appearance of puberty, the girl is taken out of the camp by some old women, and her body is anointed all over with opossum fat and ground charcoal. The fresh skin of a ring-tail opossum is procured and cut into very narrow strips. These strands, with the fur remaining upon them, are then twisted until they become small, rounded strings, resembling cords. The arms of the girl, both above and below the elbow, are then bandaged with a few coils of this string.She is then lifted into the fork of a sapling or tree, from six to eight feet above the ground. A fire is lighted at the butt of the tree, on the windward side of it, and a number of green boughs laid upon it. Presently, a dense smoke is produced, which ascends up around the girl, the quantity of fume being regulated so that it will not suffocate her. This lasts for some hours, when the novice is removed to a camp close at hand, where she and her companions remain for the night. The same  ceremonial is repeated for a day or two longer, or until the old women are satisfied that their object has been attained. A waist-belt is now given to the girl, to which is attached a small apron, dyabeng, which hangs down in front. She is now qualified to become a wife."
Minjambuta territory took in Mount Buffalo which was a key centre of the Bogong moth's aestivation, and together with many other regional tribes, particularly the Djilamatang, the Walgalu and the Jaitmathang, they would travel up to these areas rich in this sweet food source, and, while harvesting their share, conduct inter-tribal ceremonies which were timed to coincide with this season of abundance

History
Two stockmen, Jim Brown and Jack Wells, employed by the squatter George Gray at Cobungra near Mt Hotham visited in 1851 the Bogong High Plains in search of fresh pastures in 1851. Within the decade, stock were being regularly driven into these tribal lands to graze there.

Alternative names
 Mr Buffalo tribe'
 Minyambuta Mogullumbitch''

Source:

Notes

Citations

Sources

Aboriginal peoples of Victoria (Australia)